The Coordination Office for the Preservation of the Written Cultural Heritage, abbreviated in German as KEK, is situated in Germany at the Berlin State Library (Staatsbibliothek zu Berlin) as part of the Prussian Cultural Heritage Foundation (Stiftung Preußischer Kulturbesitz). Since 2011 the KEK is working on strategies for preservation of the written cultural heritage in archives and libraries in Germany. For this purpose, among other things the KEK sponsors annually innovative pilot projects on conservation.

Due to the major catastrophes of recent years in Germany – the fire at the Duchess Anna Amalia Library in Weimar in 2004 and the collapse of the Historical Archive of the city of Cologne in 2009 – the public got only too painfully aware of the vulnerability of the written cultural heritage. Finally on the initiative of the former Minister of State for Culture, Bernd Neumann, the KEK was set up. In the budget of the Minister of State for Culture annual funding amounting to 500,000 Euro has been made available; the Federal States participate with a further 100,000 Euro a year via their Cultural Foundation (Kulturstiftung der Länder).

References

German culture